Bierutów  is a town in Oleśnica County, Lower Silesian Voivodeship, in south-western Poland. It is the seat of the administrative district (gmina) called Gmina Bierutów.

As of December 2021, the town has a population of 4,728. Its castle is believed to date to the 13th century, and was the headquarters of the local forestry body after World War II.

Government

List of mayors since 1990

International relations

Twin towns - sister cities
See twin towns of Gmina Bierutów.

Notable people
 Andreas Acoluthus (1654–1704), German scholar of orientalism
 Louise Elisabeth of Württemberg-Oels (1673–1736)
 Wilhelm Sihler (1801–1885), German-American Lutheran minister and educator
 Maximilian von Prittwitz (1848–1917), Prussian general
 Josef Block (1863–1943), German painter
 Horace Kallen (1882–1974), German-American philosopher
 Ludwig Meidner (1884–1966), German expressionist painter

References

External links

 Official website 
 Jewish Community of Bierutów on Virtual Shtetl

Cities and towns in Lower Silesian Voivodeship
Oleśnica County
Cities in Silesia